United Nations station  or UN station may refer to:

Bonn UN Campus station, a railway station in North Rhine-Westphalia, Germany
United Nations station (LIRR), a temporary name for the Mets–Willets Point commuter rail station in New York, United States
United Nations station (LRT), a light rail transit station in Manila, Philippines
Civic Center/UN Plaza station, a rapid transit station in San Francisco, California, United States